is a Japanese artistic gymnast. Widely regarded as the successor of Kohei Uchimura, he won two gold medals at the 2020 Summer Olympics, in all-around and horizontal bar, as well as a silver in team. At the World Championships, he also achieved 1 gold, 5 silvers and 1 bronze.

Hashimoto became a member of the Japan men's national gymnastics team in 2019, while he was still studying at Funabashi Municipal High School. He has represented Japan in every major competition since then.

Career

2019 
Hashimoto competed at the World Championships in Stuttgart, Germany, where his team placed third all around. On the pommel horse, he finished in 9th place, and on the horizontal bar, he finished in 4th place.

2021 
Hashimoto's breakthrough arrived when he became the national all-around champion. His score of 88.532 was the highest of 2021 until being surpassed by Zhang Boheng's 88.565 result at the Chinese Olympic Trials. One month later, Hashimoto participated in NHK Trophy, and despite only achieving the second highest score of the night, he still won the title because the tournament also used the scores of All Japan AA Championships for the final results. In June, Hashimoto achieved another victory at the All Japan Event Championships. With such impressive performances, he was later selected in Japan men's national gymnastics team competing at the Olympics.

At the Olympics, Hashimoto competed in team event with Kazuma Kaya, Takeru Kitazono, Wataru Tanigawa & won the silver with only 0.103 points behind the ROC team.. He also won two gold medals in all-around and horizontal bar, making him the most successful male gymnast in Tokyo with three medals — two golds and one silver. Being just 10 days before turning 20, Hashimoto also became Japan's second youngest and one of only two teenage male gymnasts in history to accomplish that feat after Kenzō Shirai, who won team gold six days younger in 2016. This would also include by default Hashimoto becoming the youngest Japanese gymnast to win Olympic gold on the all-around and horizontal bar events. In the men's individual floor exercise and pommel horse event finals, Hashimoto would place eleventh and ninth.

At the 2021 World Championships in Kitakyushu, Hashimoto was the top qualifier on the men's individual all-around and horizontal bar, but only earned two silver medals on those events. He also placed fourth in the parallel bars, and withdrew from floor and pommel horse, despite qualified for the finals.

2022 
At the 2022 All-Japan all-around championships in late April, Hashimoto successfully defended his title, leading in both qualification & final. He also won the NHK Trophy, despite multiple falls in pommel horse & horizontal bar. In June, Hashimoto participated in All-Japan event championships, competing in floor, pommel horse, parallel bars & horizontal bar. He had previously qualified in rings but withdraw later. In floor, he won the bronze, while in pommel horse & horizontal bar finals, he made several falls & only achieved 7th & 6th place respectively. In parallel bars, he made mistakes at the qualification & did not advance to the final.

Later in late August, Hashimoto achieved the highest AA score of the year, getting 88.331 at the All-Japan Student Championships. He also won every gold & silver at every event.

Hashimoto was selected to represent Japan at the World Championships in Liverpool after winning the NHK Trophy. Despite a fall at the pommel horse in qualification, he still made it to AA, FX & HB finals. In men's team final, Japanese men made a few serious mistakes & ended up with the silver, losing the title to China. However, Hashimoto managed to win the all-around championship, reversing the 2021 result. He was also the runner-up in floor & horizontal bar, with only 0.033 & 0.100, respectively, behind the eventual champions.

Competitive history

Detailed Results

2017-2021 Code of Points

2022-2024 Code of Points

Personal life 
Hashimoto was born in Narita, Japan. 

His two older brothers, Takuya and Kengo, who competed in artistic gymnastics at the club- and university-level in Japan, inspired Hashimoto to begin gymnastics at age seven at the Sawara Junior Club.

Hashimoto has received two awards. In 2019, he received the Excellence Award at the 2019 NHK Cup. In 2020, he was given the Road to 2020 Olympic Encouragement Award at the TV Asahi Big Sports Awards.

He is a student at Juntendo University, School of Health and Sports Science in Inzai, Chiba.

See also
 List of multiple Olympic gold medalists at a single Games
 Japan men's national gymnastics team

References

External links 
 

Living people
2001 births
Sportspeople from Chiba Prefecture
Japanese male artistic gymnasts
Medalists at the World Artistic Gymnastics Championships
Gymnasts at the 2020 Summer Olympics
Olympic gymnasts of Japan
Olympic silver medalists for Japan
Olympic gold medalists for Japan
Medalists at the 2020 Summer Olympics
Olympic medalists in gymnastics
World champion gymnasts
21st-century Japanese people